Daniel Ramseier (born 1963) is a Swiss equestrian. He won a silver medal in team dressage at the 1988 Summer Olympics in Seoul, together with Otto Josef Hofer, Christine Stückelberger and Samuel Schatzmann. He also competed at the 2000 Summer Olympics and the 2004 Summer Olympics.

References

External links

1963 births
Living people
Swiss male equestrians
Swiss dressage riders
Olympic equestrians of Switzerland
Olympic silver medalists for Switzerland
Equestrians at the 1988 Summer Olympics
Equestrians at the 2000 Summer Olympics
Equestrians at the 2004 Summer Olympics
Olympic medalists in equestrian
Medalists at the 1988 Summer Olympics